Anolis hendersoni, the La Selle long-snouted anole or Henderson's anole, is a species of lizard in the family Dactyloidae. The species is found in Haiti.

References

Anoles
Endemic fauna of Haiti
Reptiles of Haiti
Reptiles described in 1923
Taxa named by Doris Mable Cochran